Tale of Gióng the Saint is a 1970 Vietnamese animated film which was based on mythology, directed by Ngô Mạnh Lân.

Plot

Production
By this film, director Ngô Mạnh Lân was called Sir "Gióng" Lân. The film was produced at the time of Vietnamization when USAF attacked North Vietnam. Vietnam Animation Studio's staff had evacuated in Vĩnh Phú province (now Phú Thọ province). They has performed the film at the night with oil lamp's light.
 Style : Puppet animation
 Artist : Mai Long
 Color printing by National Studio for Documentary and Scientific Films

Award
 Merit prize of Moskva International Film Festival, 1971.
 Golden Lotus prize at the Vietnam Film Festival II, 1973.

See also
 Gióng the Saint
 Ilya Muromets

References

Ngô Mạnh Lân
1970 films
1970 animated films
1970s animated short films
Vietnamese animated films
1970s stop-motion animated films
1970 short films